Jaroslav Brabec (27 July 1949 – 20 May 2018) was a Czech track and field athlete who competed in the shot put. He twice represented Czechoslovakia at the Summer Olympics (1972 and 1976). He was a three-time participant at the European Athletics Championships (1971, 1974 and 1978) and a three-time medallist at the European Athletics Indoor Championships, being the champion at the 1973 edition.

He was a 13-time national champion for Czechoslovakia, eight times outdoors and five indoors.

Career

Brabec was born in Litoměřice, then in Czechoslovakia, and later moved to Prague, where he joined the Dukla Prague athletics club and began competing in shot put competitions. He first emerged at national level at the age of twenty winning both the indoor and outdoor national titles. He threw beyond twenty metres for the event that season and his new best of  ranked him tenth globally among shot putters for the year. This made him the first Czechoslovak shot putter to reach the top ten since Jiří Skobla in 1961. At the 1971 European Athletics Championships he did not perform as well, however, failing to make it through the qualifying round.

He won his first international medal at the 1972 European Athletics Indoor Championships: following on from Skobla's bronze medal in 1966, Brabec himself took the bronze medal behind Hartmut Briesenick of East Germany and Poland's Władysław Komar. He reached his first Olympic final later that year, coming tenth overall. A new national rival – Jaromír Vlk – finished one place ahead of him.

Brabec became only the third Czechoslovak man to win at that competition, following on from 800 m runner Jozef Plachý and triple jumper Petr Nemšovský. He also won a second national title that year. He had his highest ever seasonal ranking in 1973, in fourth place behind Americans Al Feuerbach and George Woods and Germany's Briesenick.

In the 1974 season he was usurped at the national championships by Vlk, but managed to win the third medal of his career at the 1974 European Athletics Indoor Championships. He also competed at the 1974 European Athletics Championships, taking seventh place in what was his highest ever finish at that tournament. A national title double in 1976 preceded his second Olympic appearance at the 1976 Montreal Games, at which he ranked eleventh in the final. He had his last three major international outings at the end of the 1970s, taking sixth at the 1978 and 1979 European Athletics Indoor Championships, as well as eighth at the 1978 European Athletics Championships.

Brabec continued to be a presence at national level, taking national indoor titles in 1978 and 1979, before having three further outdoor wins in 1979, 1981 and 1982. The rise of World Championships medallist Remigius Machura coincided with the end of Brabec's career at a high level.

After retiring from competition, he served as coach for the athletics section of Dukla Prague. Among those he trained were Machura, František Vrbka, Robert Změlík, Vladimíra Racková, Pavel Sedláček, Vladimír Maška and Jan Železný. Brabec died on 20 May 2018.

International competitions

National titles
Czechoslovak Athletics Championships
Shot put: 1971, 1972, 1973, 1975, 1976, 1979, 1981, 1982
Czechoslovak Indoor Championships
Shot put: 1971, 1973, 1975, 1978, 1979

See also
List of European Athletics Indoor Championships medalists (men)

References

External links

1949 births
2018 deaths
People from Litoměřice
Czech athletics coaches
Czechoslovak male shot putters
Czech male shot putters
Olympic male shot putters
Olympic athletes of Czechoslovakia
Athletes (track and field) at the 1972 Summer Olympics
Athletes (track and field) at the 1976 Summer Olympics
Sportspeople from the Ústí nad Labem Region